This is a list of gliders/sailplanes of the world, (this reference lists all gliders with references, where available) 
Note: Any aircraft can glide for a short time, but gliders are designed to glide for longer.

Z

Zalewski
(Wladyslaw Zalewski & Boleslaw Zalewski / Centralne Warsztaty Lotnicze – Central Aviation workshops)
 Zalewski W.Z.II
 Zalewski W.Z.VIII'DePeŻe'
 Zalewski W.Z.X

Zannier
(Ugo Zannier)
 Zannier Friuli

ZASPL
(Warsztaty Związek Awiatyczny Studentów Politechniki Lwowskiej – Aviation Association of Lwów Technical University's Students Workshops)
 ZASPL 1913 glider - Władysław & Tadeusz Florjańsky
 ZASPL Osa
 Za Mir
 ZA Szybowiec – (Związek Awiatyczny - ZA glider)

Zauner
(Otto Zauner)
 Zauner OZ-4 – HP-14 modification
 Zauner OZ-5 One-Yankee

Zbaraż
(Zbaraż - Poland)
 Zbaraż School Glider

Zeise-Nesemann
(Zeise & A. Nesemann)
 Zeise 1921 MPA
 Zeise-Nesemann Bird
 Zeise-Nesemann Senator

Zeman
(Cpt. Tomáš Zeman)
 Zeman HLDZ-1
 Zeman HLDZ-2 Čáp

Zemgale (glider constructor)
 Zemgale (glider)

Ziemelnieks (glider constructor)
 Ziemelnieks glider)

Zinno
(Joseph Zinno)
 Zinno Olympian ZB-1

Zlin
Data from:
 Zlín-I 1933 KRYŠPÍN, Jan
 Zlín-II 1933 KRYŠPÍN, Jan
 Zlín-III 1934 DOHNÁLEK, Rudolf
 Zlin-IV 1934 DOHNÁLEK, Rudolf
 Zlin-V 1934 MAYER, František Oskar
 Zlin-V Sitno 1934	Tchécoslovaquie	MAYER, František Oskar
 Zlin-VI 1934 MAYER, František Oskar
 Zlín VII Akela
 Zlin-VIII Šídlo 1934 MAYER, František Oskar
 Zlin-VIIIB Dáša 1936 MAYER, František Oskar
 Zlín-X
 Zlin-X-2 1937 LONEK, Jaroslav
 Zlin Z-23 Honza
 Zlín Z 24 Krajanek
 Zlin Z-25 Šohaj (laddy)
 Zlin Z-25 LG Šohaj
 Zlin Z-124 Galánka
 Zlin L-125 Sohaj 2
 Zlin Z-128 Sohaj 2
 Zlin Z-128 Sohaj 3
 Zlin L-425 Sohaj 3 - SMRCEK, Marcol
 Zlin LG-130 Kmotr

Zrna
(Antonín Zrna)
 Zrna FPZ-1 Chichich

Zsebõ
(Ferenc Zsebõ - designer)
 Zsebõ Z-03 Ifjúság
 Zsebõ Z-04 Béke
 Zsebõ A-08 Sirály I Alagi Központi Kisérleti Üzem, Dunakeszi
 Zsebõ A-08b Sirály II Sportárutermelõ V. (formerly Aero-Ever Ltd)

Zsélyi (glider constructor)  
 Zsélyi 2

Zwickau
(Flugtechnischer Verein Zwickau)
 Zwickau Sorgenkind

Zygmund-Pawliczak
(Ludwik Zygmund & Antoni Pawliczak)
 Zygmund-Pawliczak ZP

Notes

Further reading

External links

Lists of glider aircraft